Aibek Oralbay (Aibek Oralbai; born 11 June 2000) is a Kazakh amateur boxer. While representing Kazakhstan in the heavyweight division, he won a gold medal at the 2018 Youth Olympics and silver at the 2018 Youth World Championships.

He is the twin brother of fellow boxer Nurbek Oralbay.

References

External links

Living people
2000 births
Kazakhstani male boxers
Heavyweight boxers
Sportspeople from Astana
Twin sportspeople
Kazakhstani twins
Boxers at the 2018 Summer Youth Olympics
Youth Olympic gold medalists for Kazakhstan
21st-century Kazakhstani people